Stephen John Brademas Jr. (March 2, 1927 – July 11, 2016) was an American politician and educator originally from Indiana. He served as Majority Whip of the United States House of Representatives for the Democratic Party from 1977 to 1981 at the conclusion of a twenty-year career as a member of the United States House of Representatives. In addition he was a board member of the New York Stock Exchange and the Rockefeller Foundation.

Early life and career

The oldest of four children, Brademas was born in 1927 to Stephen John Brademas, a Greek immigrant father, and the former Beatrice Goble, an American mother, in Mishawaka, Indiana. His father ran a restaurant and his mother was an elementary school teacher. He  spent summers with his maternal grandfather, who was the state superintendent of schools in Canada, and possessed a large library.

Brademas graduated as valedictorian from Central High School in South Bend, Indiana. He served two years in the U.S. Navy, stationed in Milwaukee, Wisconsin.
He attended Harvard University, from which he graduated with an A.B. magna cum laude and Phi Beta Kappa and where he was affiliated with Adams House. His Harvard thesis, The Sinarquista Movement in Mexico: Its Implications for the United States, was published in April 1949.  He won a Rhodes Scholarship and attended Brasenose College, Oxford, from which he received his D.Phil. in Social Studies.

Congressional service

Brademas served as United States Representative in Congress from Indiana's 3rd congressional district for 22 years (1959–81), the last four as House majority whip. While in Congress he was a member of the Committee on Education and Labor, where he played a leading role in writing most of the federal legislation enacted during that time concerning schools, colleges and universities; services for the elderly and the handicapped; libraries and museums; and the arts and humanities.

Brademas holds the distinction of being the first Greek-American member of Congress, preceding, among others, Olympia Snowe, Paul Tsongas and Paul Sarbanes.

Cosponsor of the 1965 legislation creating the National Endowment for the Arts (NEA) and the National Endowment for the Humanities (NEH), Brademas for ten years chaired the congressional subcommittee with jurisdiction over them. He was chief House sponsor of the Arts, Humanities and Cultural Affairs Act; Arts and Artifacts Indemnity Act; Museum Services Act; Library Services and Construction Act; National Commission on Libraries and Information Services Act; Education for All Handicapped Children Act; Alcohol and Drug Abuse Education Act; and International Education Act. He was also a major co-author of the Elementary and Secondary Education Act of 1965; the Higher Education Acts of 1972 and 1976, which focused on student aid; and the measure creating the National Institute of Education.

In December 1963, the Studebaker Corporation closed its South Bend, Indiana automobile manufacturing plants, putting more than 5,000 people out of work. Brademas was instrumental in helping the South Bend area recover from the Studebaker closing through his contacts in Washington. In 1964, after receiving an $81 million contract from the government, Kaiser Jeep Corporation purchased the Chippewa Avenue truck plant from Studebaker, and put a sizable number of people back to work building military and postal vehicles. Today, although the Chippewa plant is no longer in use, AM General, successor to Kaiser Jeep and American Motors Corporation, produces the military Humvee and the Hummer H1 and H2 in Mishawaka, Indiana, just east of South Bend. This would have been nearly impossible without the work of John Brademas in the mid-1960s. Brademas was defeated for reelection on November 4, 1980, by Republican John Hiler in an outcome that was driven largely by the national political climate and the Ronald Reagan vs. Jimmy Carter presidential election campaign.

Career in education
After leaving Congress, Brademas moved to New York and served as president of New York University from 1981 to 1992. In 1990, he co-chaired the bipartisan independent commission mandated by Congress to review the grant-making procedures of the NEA. He was appointed by President Bill Clinton as chairman of the President's Committee on the Arts and the Humanities, and was also chairman of the National Endowment for Democracy, as well as a member of the Consultants' Panel to the Comptroller General of the United States.

Film actress Paulette Goddard left her multimillion-dollar estate to New York University in large part due to her friendship with Brademas.

Foundations and boards

Brademas served on a number of boards and national commissions on subjects ranging from the arts to higher education, foreign policy, jobs and small business, historic documents and records, and science, technology and government.

He was the chairman of the American Ditchley Foundation and co-chaired  the Center for Science, Technology and Congress at the American Association for the Advancement of Science in Washington, D.C.

Brademas served as chairman of the board of the Federal Reserve Bank of New York, as well as on the boards of Overseers of Harvard, New York Stock Exchange, Rockefeller Foundation and the Central Committee of the World Council of Churches. He is a fellow of the American Academy of Arts and Sciences and the Academy of Athens. He served on several corporate board as well as boards of the Alexander S. Onassis Public Benefit Foundation, American Council for the Arts, Center for National Policy and the Spanish Institute.

Brademas was awarded honorary degrees by 47 colleges and universities. He also received the annual Award for Distinguished Service to the Arts of the American Academy and Institute of Arts and Letters. The Middle Common Room of Brasenose College, Oxford, is located in the Brademas Room, which is named in honor of Brademas.

Later life
On October 3, 2011, the King of Spain bestowed on John Brademas the Order of Isabella the Catholic, a Spanish civil order granted in recognition of services that benefit the country.

Brademas died on July 11, 2016 at the age of 89. He is interred at the Congressional Cemetery. He was survived by his wife Mary, a physician.

Legacy
South Bend’s main post office was officially named the “John Brademas Post Office” in his honor.

References

External links 

Guide to the John Brademas Congressional Papers by New York University
 
 

|-

|-

|-

|-

|-

1927 births
2016 deaths
Alumni of Brasenose College, Oxford
American people of Greek descent
American Rhodes Scholars
American United Methodists
Democratic Party members of the United States House of Representatives from Indiana
Harvard University alumni
Members of the European Academy of Sciences and Arts
People from Mishawaka, Indiana
Presidents of New York University
Saint Mary's College (Indiana) faculty
20th-century Methodists